Kalidhang is a mountain of the Garhwal Himalaya in Uttarakhand India. It is situated in the Gangotri National Park. It is joint 105th highest located entirely within the Uttrakhand. Nanda Devi, is the highest mountain in this category. It lies 3 km WNW of Chirbas Parbat  its nearest higher neighbor. Matri  lies 5.7 km SE and it is 11.8 km NNE of Manda I . It lies 10.1 km NNW of Sudarshan Parbat .

Neighboring peaks

Neighboring peaks of Kalidhang:
 Chirbas Parbat  
 Chaturbhuj  
 Matri 
 Sudarshan Parbat 
 Yogeshwar:

Glaciers and rivers
It stands at the head of Dehigad Bamak which flows from south to north and joins river Jadh Ganga. Chaudar Bamak on the west side also drains down to Jadh Ganga. On the south west side lies Deogad Bamak which drains into Bhagirathi river between chirbas and Gangotri. Chirbas Bamak and Gulli gad bamak on the eastern side from there emerges gulligad which also joins Jadh Ganga near Neylong. that further joins Bhagirathi River near Bharion ghati. one of the main tributaries of river Ganga. that later joins Alaknanda River the other main tributaries of river Ganga at Devprayag and became Ganga there after.
The word "Bamak" is used for Glacier.

See also

 List of Himalayan peaks of Uttarakhand

References

Mountains of Uttarakhand
Six-thousanders of the Himalayas
Geography of Chamoli district